

Overview 
Digitas Health is an interactive marketing agency catering exclusively to healthcare and pharmaceutical companies. The company was founded in 1990 as Medical Broadcasting Corporation and became a unit of Digitas in 2006 as Digitas Health. In 2011, the agency became independent of Digitas, and integrated into the Publicis Healthcare Communications Group (PHCG), the world’s largest healthcare communications network. PHCG is part of Paris-based Publicis Groupe the world’s third largest communications group, second largest media counsel and buying group, and in digital and healthcare communications.

In 2014 Digitas Health was re-branded as Digitas Health LifeBrands, and now has more than 600 employees working in Philadelphia, New York, San Francisco, London, and Mumbai.

Global Management Team 
 Alexandra von Plato, Group President, North America, Publicis Healthcare Communications Group
 Ashley Kuchel, Group President, EU/APAC, Publicis Healthcare Communications Group
 Graham Mills, Global Chief Creative Officer, Publicis Healthcare Communications Group

References

Advertising agencies of the United States